The Champlain Trail Lakes are a group of lakes on the southern point of Whitewater Region in Ontario. They lie in more or less a straight line and are named for the fact that explorer Samuel de Champlain used them to portage around the Chenaux Rapids while exploring the Ottawa River. Coldingham, Catharine and Garden Lake all drain into Browns Bay. The rest of the lakes drain into the Muskrat River which flows through each successively.

The Champlain Trail Lakes include:

Coldingham Lake
Catharine Lake
Garden Lake
Edmunds Lake
Blanchards Lake
Smiths Lake
Lake Galilee
Dump Lake
Eadys Lake
Pumphouse Lake
Olmstead-Jeffrey Lake

Lakes of Renfrew County